Diego Antonio Torre Villegas (Mexico City, November 24, 1979) is a Mexican and Australian opera singer. He is a resident singer in the Sydney Opera House (Australia).

Early life 
Born in Vicente Guerrero colony at Iztapalapa, Torre began singing lessons after a music teacher at his elementary school "Instituto Andersen"] recommended to his parents that he should receive them. He studied at the "Academia Militarizada México" for high school, where he sang for the professors and the cloister at meals and events. He also belonged to La Estudiantina at the "La Salle del Pedregal" High School. During that school time he sang Beethoven's Ninth Symphony and Verdi's Requiem with the National Symphony Orchestra and the Acapulco Philharmonic.

Training period 
Torre studied at the School of Music of the National Autonomous University of Mexico. He applied by chance when he went with a friend to pick up some scores and saw that the application office was open. He studied Canto under the Chair of Maestro Rufino Montero. At age 20, he debuted with the Compañía Nacional de Ópera in the Palacio de Bellas Artes while performing as Gaston in La Traviata and chose opera as a career from then on.

During his training period (2003-2005) Torre won some opera prizes of Mexico and Latin America: Nicolás Urcelay National Song Competition of Mérida (Yucatán), XXIII Carlo Morelli National Singing Competition (2005) in third place, achieving the Instrumenta Prize, the Opera Bellas Artes Award, and the special FONCA prize; he also was first place at the Francisco Araiza Singing Contest.

In 2004 and 2005, Torre trained through a summer program with the Ezio Pinza Council for American Singers of Opera (EPCASO), while also receiving training in Italy with teachers Claudia Pinza, Enza Ferrari, Maurizio Arena and Maria Chiara. In 2005 he received the support of the International Society of Mexican Art Values (SIVAM), and was able to travel to Los Angeles to audition at Plácido Domingo Young Singers Program. He auditioned with a solo accompanied by piano, and he was accepted and moved to Los Angeles in 2007.  On 6 December 2008, he made his international debut at the Los Angeles Opera as Don Jose in Bizet's Carmen.

Operatic career 
In 2007, at age 27, Torre won third place in the Neue Stimmen (New Voices) opera competition organized by the Bertelsmann Foundation in Gütersloh, Germany. He sang an aria from Un Ballo in Maschera (A dance of masks) by Verdi.

In 2009, Torre represented Rodolfo in La bohème at Filene Center of Wolf Trap (Virginia). The atmosphere in the internet cafes of the 21st century, with laptops and digital sets, gathered musicians from the National Symphony Orchestra, choirs of the Choral Arts Society and the Choir of Children of the Choral Society of Alexandria. The Washington Times review was: “As Rodolfo, tenor Diego Torre was simply smashing. Built like a beer-loving construction worker you’d see at a local watering hole, Mr. Torre hardly seemed a conventional romantic lead. Yet most guys in the audience could easily identify with this everyman. His passion was real, his heartbreak was immense, and his commanding, gloriously sculpted instrument makes him an up-and-coming talent to be watched.”

During the 2009/2010 season he performed at the Metropolitan Opera House in New York, playing the Messenger in Aida and Federico in Stiffelio. And he continued his work as a tenor in other opera houses. He was the fisherman Masaniello in La muette de Portici (Dessau Opera), Edgardo in Lucia di Lammermoor (Opera Festival of Savonlinna, Finland), and was the cover of Plácido Domingo in the main role of Il Postino in Los Angeles Opera.

The 2009/10 season led him to the main world opera theatres, playing the most prominent roles of the classical repertoire and making himself known at the highest levels of the profession.

While Torre was in New York, Lyndon Terracini, the Director of the Australian Opera, offered him a 22 performance run of La Bohème at the Australian Opera. He accepted a position as a Resident Tenor there. On Australia Day 2016 (26 Jan), he sang the national anthem to the Prime Minister, Malcolm Turnbull, during the official memorial ceremony. He was one of 27 people from 13 countries becoming an Australian citizen.

His performing abilities and voice power allowed him to be member of an exclusive club. He is one of the few tenors who can double and represent on the same night Turiddu in Cavalleria Rusticana and Canio in Pagliacci.

Among the experts Diego Torre is considered to have an operatic voice fitted with a solid technique, which allows him to range from a tenore lirico repertoire to a tenore lirico spinto,  one from Donizetti to Verdi, from Puccini to Mascagni, from Leoncavallo to Zemlinsky.

In 2012 he recorded Puccini's La bohème, with the Norwegian National Opera Orchestra conducted by Eivind Gullberg Jensen. This album is considered by the New York Times as one of the best albums of classical music.

Classical Repertoire 

He has performed in the main Opera theaters of the world and with the main companies: Boston Lyric Opera, Florida Grand Opera, Metropolitan Opera, San Francisco Opera, Los Angeles Opera and Dorothy Chandler Pavilion, all of them in the United States; Sydney Opera House, Melbourne Arts Center, and Queensland Performing Arts Center in Australia; Palacio de Bellas Artes and Peon Cotreras Theater in Mexico; Savonlinna Opera Festival, in Finland; Karlsruhe Staatstheater, Dessau Staatstheater, Darmstadt Staatstheater and Saarbrücken Staatstheater, in Germany; Teatro Comunale di Bologna, Teatro Carlo Felice Genova and Teatro Regio di Torino in Italy; The Norwegian Opera & Ballet in Norway, Grand-Théâtre de Genève in Geneva and the Xi'an Symphony Orchestra in China.

Awards 

 2003 Nicolás Urcelay National Singing Competition in Mérida, Yucatán
 2005 XXIII Carlo Morelli National Singing Competition
 2005 Instrumenta Award
 2005 Special FONCA Award
 2005 Bellas Artes Award
 2007 XX Neue Stimmen Opera Competition (New Voices), 3rd Prize, Bertelsmann Foundation, Germany

External links 
 Diego Torre Official Web Site

References 

21st-century Mexican male opera singers
Mexican operatic tenors
Australian operatic tenors
1979 births
Living people